Riña en un café (Spanish: "Rush in a cafe") Spanish short silent film directed by Fructuós Gelabert.

It is considered the first Spanish film with a plot.

See also 
 Cinema of Spain
 List of Spanish films before 1930

External links 
 

1897 films
Spanish silent films
Spanish black-and-white films